Scotospilus is a genus of dwarf sheet spiders that was first described by Eugène Simon in 1886.

Species
 it contains nine species:
Scotospilus ampullarius (Hickman, 1948) – Australia (Tasmania)
Scotospilus bicolor Simon, 1886 (type) – Australia (Tasmania)
Scotospilus divisus (Forster, 1970) – New Zealand
Scotospilus longus Zhang, Li & Pham, 2013 – Vietnam
Scotospilus maindroni (Simon, 1906) – India
Scotospilus nelsonensis (Forster, 1970) – New Zealand
Scotospilus plenus (Forster, 1970) – New Zealand
Scotospilus wellingtoni (Hickman, 1948) – Australia (Tasmania)
Scotospilus westlandicus (Forster, 1970) – New Zealand

References

Araneomorphae genera
Hahniidae
Spiders of Asia
Spiders of Australia
Spiders of New Zealand
Taxa named by Eugène Simon